Edward S. Yeung is a Chinese-American chemist who studies spectroscopy and chromatography. Yeung is a Distinguished Professor Emeritus at Iowa State University. He was elected as a Fellow of the American Association for the Advancement of Science.   He was a founding co-editor of the Annual Review of Analytical Chemistry from 2008 to 2014 and has served on the editorial committees of a number of other journals.

Yeung was the first person to quantitatively analyze the chemical contents of a single human red blood cell (erythrocyte). His research group has developed a method using capillary electrophoresis (CE) to identify the coenzymes NAD+ and NADH within a cell. Such developments could lead to improved detection of AIDS, cancer and genetic diseases such as Alzheimer disease, muscular dystrophy, and Down syndrome. Yeung has won four R&D 100 Awards and an Editor's Choice award from R&D Magazine for this pioneering work. He is also the 2002 recipient of the American Chemical Society Award in Chromatography for his research in chemical separations.

References

External links
 

21st-century American chemists
Iowa State University faculty
Cornell University alumni
Living people
Year of birth missing (living people)
American people of Chinese descent
UC Berkeley College of Chemistry alumni
Annual Reviews (publisher) editors